Robinson is an extinct town in Okanogan County, in the U.S. state of Washington. The GNIS classifies it as a populated place.

A post office called Robinson was established in 1900, and remained in operation until 1902. The community had the name of James Robinson, a pioneer hunter.

References

Ghost towns in Washington (state)
Geography of Okanogan County, Washington